Maryland County is a county in the southeastern portion of Liberia. One of 15 counties that comprise the first-level of administrative division in the nation, it has two districts. As of the 2008 Census, it had a population of 136,404, making it the seventh most populous county in Liberia.

Named after the State of Maryland in the United States, it was an independent country as the Republic of Maryland from 1854 until it joined Liberia in 1857. The most populous city in the county is Pleebo, with 22,963 residents, while Maryland's County Superintendent is Nazarine Tubman. The county is bordered by Grand Kru County to the west and River Gee County to the north. The eastern part of Maryland borders the nation of Ivory Coast (Côte d'Ivoire), separated by the Cavalla River.

History
Maryland was first established as a colony of the Maryland State Colonization Society in 1834, but was not granted independence until 1854. The Maryland Society had played a pivotal role on the formation of the larger American Colonization Society years before.
Following a referendum in 1853, the colony declared its independence from the Colonization Society across the Atlantic Ocean and formed the Republic of Maryland. It held the land along the south coast between the Grand Cess and San Pedro Rivers.

In 1856, the Republic of Maryland requested military aid from nearby Liberia in a war with the Grebo and Kru peoples who were resisting the Maryland settlers' efforts to control their trade in slaves. Liberian President Joseph Jenkins Roberts assisted the Marylanders, and a joint military campaign resulted in victory. Following a referendum in February 1857 the Republic of Maryland joined Liberia as Maryland County on 6 April 1857. As of May 2004, a DRC census estimated the county's population to be 107,100.

During the 1970s, Maryland County was terrorized by ritual killings. The crimes have been regarded as "Liberia's most notorious ritual killing case" due to the number of murders, the involvement of high ranking government officials and their subsequent public executions.

Districts
Districts of Maryland County include (2008 population):

 Harper District
 Barrobo District
 Pleebo/Sodeken District
 Karluway District

Details

Farming is the main economic activity in Maryland County, accounting for the employment of approximately 60% of residents. Rice and cassava are the main crops raised in the county. It is roughly estimated that about 98% of the county's population is Christian, 1% Muslim, and 1% Animist.

The flag of Maryland County, Liberia, consists of a drawing of a tree and a lighthouse on a cliff with a small Liberian flag in the upper left corner.

In 2007, WBAL-TV in Baltimore produced a documentary special titled Africa's Maryland, which focused on this region and its cultural roots to the American state of Maryland.

References

External links
CIA World Factbook
WBAL-TV's documentary, "Africa's Maryland"
County Development Agenda
Place name codes

 
Counties of Liberia
1850s establishments in Liberia
1857 establishments in Africa